Statistics of Swedish football Division 3 for the 1969 season.

League standings

Norra Norrland, Övre 1969

Norra Norrland, Nedre 1969

Södra Norrland, Övre 1969

Södra Norrland, Nedre 1969

Norra Svealand 1969

Östra Svealand 1969

Västra Svealand 1969

Nordöstra Götaland 1969

Nordvästra Götaland 1969

Mellersta Götaland 1969

Sydöstra Götaland 1969

Sydvästra Götaland 1969

Skåne 1969

Footnotes

References 

Swedish Football Division 3 seasons
3
Swed
Swed